The Courtyard of a House in Delft is a 1658 painting in the National Gallery, London made in the Dutch Golden Age by Pieter de Hooch. The painting portrays domestic architecture typical of de Hooch's middle period; the details and textures of the building and courtyard are given as much or more of the artist's attention as the people. It is signed and dated to the left on the archway "P.D.H. / A 1658".

The scene is divided into two pieces. To the left, an archway of brick and stone leads from a paved courtyard a passageway though a house, where a woman dressed in black and red stands looking away to the street beyond. It reads, in Dutch: "Dit is in sint hieronimus daelle / wildt v tot pacientie en lydtsaemheijt begeeven / vvand wij muetten eerst daellen / willen wy worden verheeven 1614" (in English: "This is in Saint Jerome's dale /  please be patient and meek / for we must first descend / if we wish to be raised."). When the cloister was suppressed this tablet was removed but can still be seen set into the wall of a garden behind the canal.  

To the right, a vine is growing over a wooden structure, with an open door through the brick wall to the far right, and a woman dressed in white and blue leading a child down steps to the courtyard. The woman is carrying a dish in her other hand, and a bucket and a broom have been left in the courtyard.

Similar figures can also be seen in contemporaneous works including A Woman Drinking with Two Men (1658), and the woman in black and red can be seen in A Boy Bringing Bread (1663). A similar composition with the same doorway can be seen in the Courtyard with an Arbour, also dated 1658, which sold at Christie's in London in December 1992 for £4.4 million.

The painting was documented by Hofstede de Groot in 1908, and catalogued by John Smith (Sm. Suppl. 50) and de Groot (de G. 38). 

It remained in the Netherlands until 1825, when it was bought by Sir Robert Peel.  It was engraved by Paul Adolphe Rajon. It was sold in 1871 by Peel's son Sir Robert Peel, 3rd Baronet, along with the rest of his father's art collection, to the National Gallery, London, where it was No. 835 in the 1906 catalogue.

The work was the subject of a poem by Derek Mahon.

References

External links
 Pieter de Hooch, The Courtyard of a House in Delft, National Gallery

1658 paintings
Paintings by Pieter de Hooch
Collections of the National Gallery, London
Courtyards